HMS Winchester was a 50-gun fourth-rate ship of the line of the Royal Navy, built at Rotherhithe to the dimensions prescribed by the 1741 proposals of the 1719 Establishment, and launched on 3 May 1744.

Winchester was sold out of the navy in 1769.

Notes

References

 Lavery, Brian (2003) The Ship of the Line - Volume 1: The development of the battlefleet 1650-1850. Conway Maritime Press. .

Ships of the line of the Royal Navy
1744 ships